The  is the 5th edition of the Japan Film Professional Awards. It awarded the best of 1995 in film. The ceremony took place on April 26, 1996, at Theatre Shinjuku in Tokyo.

Awards 
Best Film: Another Lonely Hitman
Best Director: Rokurō Mochizuki (Another Lonely Hitman, Kitanai Yatsu)
Best Actress: Yuki Uchida (Hana Yori Dango)
Best Actor: Ryo Ishibashi (Another Lonely Hitman)
Best New Encouragement: Mikio Osawa (Nihonsei Shōnen)
Best New Encouragement: Kaori Shimada (Nihonsei Shōnen)
Best New Encouragement: Kimika Yoshino (Eko Eko Azarak)
Best New Director: Shiori Kazama (Fuyu no Kappa)
Special: Kokuei (For making an extreme Pink film for a long time.)

10 best films
 Another Lonely Hitman (Rokurō Mochizuki)
 Gonin (Takashi Ishii)
 Eko Eko Azarak (Shimako Satō)
 Berlin (Gō Rijū)
 Nihonsei Shōnen (Ataru Oikawa)
 Hanako-san (Joji Matsuoka)
 Endless Waltz (Kōji Wakamatsu)
 Burai Heiya (Teruo Ishii)
 Score (Atsushi Muroga)
 Getting Any? (Takeshi Kitano)

References

External links
  

Japan Film Professional Awards
1996 in Japanese cinema
Japan Film Professional Awards
April 1996 events in Asia